Atiliano Félix Bernardelli Thierry (1866, Rio Grande do Sul, Brazil – 1908, Guadalajara, Mexico) was a Brazilian Mexican painter and musician. He spent most of his life in Mexico teaching art. Gerardo Murillo and Roberto Montenegro were among his pupils.

Personal life
He was the brother of Mexican-born sculptor Rodolfo Bernardelli and Chilean-born painter Henrique Bernardelli. He was of Italian descent.

Selected paintings

References

External links

Brazilian painters
Mexican landscape painters
Mexican portrait painters
1866 births
1908 deaths
Brazilian classical musicians
Artists from Guadalajara, Jalisco
Brazilian emigrants to Mexico
Brazilian people of Italian descent
People from Rio Grande do Sul
19th-century Mexican painters
19th-century Brazilian male artists
19th-century Mexican male artists
Mexican male painters
20th-century Mexican painters
20th-century Brazilian male artists
20th-century Mexican male artists